Laclede is a city in Linn County, Missouri. The population was 305 at the 2020 census, down from 345 in 2010.

History
Laclede was platted in 1853. The city was named for Pierre Laclède, the founder of St. Louis.

A post office called Laclede has been in operation since 1856. In July 2011 the United States Postal Service announced plans to permanently close the Laclede post office as part of a nationwide restructuring plan.

The Locust Creek Covered Bridge, Gen. John J. Pershing Boyhood Home, and Plum Grove School are listed on the National Register of Historic Places.

Geography
Laclede is located at  (39.787421, -93.169749).

Demographics

2010 census
As of the census of 2010, there were 345 people, 163 households, and 95 families living in the city. The racial makeup of the city was 98.3% White, 0.6% African American, 0.9% Native American, and 0.3% from two or more races. Hispanic or Latino of any race were 0.3% of the population.

There were 163 households, of which 20.9% had children under the age of 18 living with them, 44.8% were married couples living together, 8.6% had a female householder with no husband present, 4.9% had a male householder with no wife present, and 41.7% were non-families. 38.0% of all households were made up of individuals, and 16% had someone living alone who was 65 years of age or older. The average household size was 2.12 and the average family size was 2.73.

The median age in the city was 46.3 years. 19.7% of residents were under the age of 18; 5.9% were between the ages of 18 and 24; 21.9% were from 25 to 44; 30.2% were from 45 to 64; and 22.3% were 65 years of age or older. The gender makeup of the city was 48.7% male and 51.3% female.

2000 census
As of the census of 2000, there were 415 people, 182 households, and 117 families living in the city. The population density was 333.3 people per square mile (128.2/km2). There were 200 housing units at an average density of 160.6 per square mile (61.8/km2). The racial makeup of the city was 97.6% White, 1.5% African American, 0.2% Native American, 0.2% Asian, and 0.5% from two or more races. Hispanic or Latino of any race were 1.69% of the population.

There were 182 households, out of which 27.5% had children under the age of 18 living with them, 50.0% were married couples living together, 10.4% had a female householder with no husband present, and 35.2% were non-families. 33.0% of all households were made up of individuals, and 20.3% had someone living alone who was 65 years of age or older. The average household size was 2.28 and the average family size was 2.86.

In the city the population was spread out, with 24.8% under the age of 18, 6.7% from 18 to 24, 24.6% from 25 to 44, 24.1% from 45 to 64, and 19.8% who were 65 years of age or older. The median age was 40 years. For every 100 females, there were 93.9 males. For every 100 females age 18 and over, there were 84.6 males.

The median income for a household in the city was $24,688, and the median income for a family was $29,519. Males had a median income of $22,422 versus $18,542 for females. The per capita income for the city is $11,890. About 12.8% of families and 19.8% of the population were below the poverty line, including 16.2% of those under age 18 and 25.6% of those age 65 or over.

Notable person
John Joseph Pershing, Army general; commander of the AEF in World War I, was born near Laclede in 1860.

References

External links
 Historic maps of Laclede in the Sanborn Maps of Missouri Collection at the University of Missouri

Cities in Linn County, Missouri
1853 establishments in Missouri
Cities in Missouri